Fireback may refer to:

 Fireback (film)
 Fireplace fireback
 Pheasants
 Crested fireback
 Crestless fireback
 Siamese fireback